Thomas Cuffe  was an Irish politician.

Cuffe  was born in County Kilkenny and educated at  Trinity College, Dublin.

Cuffe  represented Wexford Borough from 1735 to 1743.

References

Irish MPs 1727–1760
Members of the Parliament of Ireland (pre-1801) for County Wexford constituencies
18th-century Irish people
Alumni of Trinity College Dublin